The Llandrindod Wells Deanery is a Roman Catholic deanery in the Diocese of Menevia that covers several churches in Powys and the surrounding area. In the early 2010s, the Aberystwyth Deanery was dissolved and the churches in Aberystwyth and Aberaeron became part of the Llandrindod Wells Deanery.

The dean is centred at Our Lady of Ransom and the Holy Souls Church in Llandrindod Wells.

Churches
 Our Lady of the Angels and St Winefride, Aberystwyth
 Holy Cross Church, Aberaeron - served from Aberystwyth
 St Michael, Brecon
 St Joseph, Hay-on-Wye
 Our Lady of Ransom and the Holy Souls, Llandrindod Wells
 Christ the King, Builth Wells - served from Llandrindod Wells
 St Francis of Assisi Church, Rhayader
 Assumption of Our Lady and St Therese, Presteigne - served from Rhayader
 Our Lady of Perpetual Succour and St Nicholas, Knighton - served from Rhayader

Gallery

References

External links
 Diocese of Menevia site
 Our Lady of the Angels and St Winefride Parish site

Roman Catholic Deaneries in the Diocese of Menevia
Llandrindod Wells